Jingjing or Jing Jing may refer to:

Jingjing (monk), 8th-century Christian monk in China
Jingjing and Chacha, mascots of the Internet Surveillance Division of the Public Security Bureau in Shenzhen, China
One of the Fuwa, mascots of the 2008 Summer Olympics

People with the given name
Jing Jing Luo (born 1953), Chinese composer
Guo Jingjing (born 1981), Chinese diver
Jing-Jing Lee (born 1985), Singaporean author
Li Jingjing (canoeist) (born 1985), Chinese slalom canoer
Li Jingjing (rower) (born 1994), Chinese rower